In taxonomy, the Thermoproteales are an order of the Thermoprotei. They are the only organisms known to lack the SSB proteins, instead possessing the protein ThermoDBP that has displaced them. 
The rRNA genes of these organisms contain multiple introns, which can be homing endonuclease encoding genes, and their presence can impact the binding of "universal" 16S rRNA primers often used in environmental sequencing surveys.

References

Further reading

Scientific journals

Scientific books

Scientific databases

External links

Archaea taxonomic orders
Thermoproteota